Samuel Hood was an Anglican priest in the mid 19th century.

Hood was born at Devizes.  He was Dean of Argyll and The Isles from 1842 until his death on 30 March 1872.

References

1782 births
People from Devizes
Deans of Argyll and The Isles
1872 deaths